Piece of Time is the debut album by American technical death metal band Atheist, recorded in 1988 but not released officially until 1990. This was because the label that Atheist had initially signed with, Mean Machine Records, was going bankrupt, and the band had to search for another label. They eventually signed with UK label Active Records, who released their album in Europe soon after. The album was not released in the US for another six months, until Metal Blade Records finally arranged a licensing deal with Active Records and released it to the American market in November 1990. Piece of Time is the only Atheist album to feature bassist Roger Patterson, although he wrote much of the bass on Unquestionable Presence.

Reception 
In 2005, Piece of Time was ranked number 402 in Rock Hard magazine's book The 500 Greatest Rock & Metal Albums of All Time. It was described by James Hinchliffe in Terrorizer as the band's "least technically accomplished release and their most lyrically immature, [yet] it remains an exceptional work of late 80s deaththrash, crackling with an uncommon energy and creativity".

Track listing

2002 Re-release 
In 2002, EMG Entertainment re-released Piece of Time. Originally, EMG Entertainment was supposed to reissue all three Atheist albums, but Kelly Shaefer aborted those plans after only Piece of Time had been reissued. This release has been digitally remastered, and features six bonus tracks.

2005 Re-release 
In 2005, Relapse Records re-released Piece of Time, this time along with the rest of Atheist's catalogue. This release was also digitally remastered, and features nine bonus tracks.

Personnel

Atheist 
 Kelly Shaefer – vocals, rhythm guitar
 Rand Burkey – lead guitar
 Roger Patterson – bass
 Steve Flynn – drums

Production 

 Scott Burns – production
 Atheist – production
 Borivoj Krgin – executive production
 Scott Burns – engineering
 Mike Fuller – mastering
 Ed Repka – cover art

Recorded at Morrisound Recording. Mastered at Fuller Sound.

References 

1990 debut albums
Atheist (band) albums
Active Records albums
Relapse Records albums
Albums produced by Scott Burns (record producer)
Albums recorded at Morrisound Recording
Albums with cover art by Ed Repka